Brigadier Dame Evelyn Marguerite Turner,  (10 May 1910 – 24 September 1993), known as Margot Turner, was a British military nurse and nursing administrator. A prisoner of war during the Second World War, she resumed her career following liberation and served in a succession of foreign postings.

Nursing career
Turner served with Queen Alexandra's Imperial Military Nursing Service from 1937 to 1949 and Queen Alexandra's Royal Army Nursing Corps (QARANC) from 1949 to 1968. She served as Matron-in-Chief of QARANC and Director, Army Nursing Services (1964–68) and was Colonel-Commandant of QARANC from 1969 to 1974.

Prisoner of war
Turner's obituary in The Independent recounted her horrific experiences as a prisoner of war held by the Japanese. 

The television series Tenko was created by Lavinia Warner after she had worked as a researcher for the edition of the television programme This Is Your Life which featured Turner, and was convinced of the dramatic potential of the stories of women prisoners of the Japanese.

Honours
Member of the Order of the British Empire (MBE; 1946)
Dame Commander of the Order of the British Empire (DBE; 1965)

Death
Turner died at St Dunstan's home for disabled ex-servicemen and women in Brighton, East Sussex on 24 September 1993, aged 83 with nurses and her carer Geoffrey Wilcock present.

External links
Disposition of Dame Evelyn Turner's will
Oxford Biography Index entry #101053383 (subscription required)

References

1910 births
1993 deaths
English nurses
British nursing administrators
British World War II prisoners of war
Dames Commander of the Order of the British Empire
People from Finchley
Place of birth missing
World War II prisoners of war held by Japan
British women in World War II
Members of the Royal Red Cross